Visual and performing arts electropop/synthpop band  Hyperbubble released 6 studio albums, 1 live album, 3 compilation albums, 9 extended plays, 19 singles, 2 soundtracks and 3 mix albums.  They also released 8 music videos.

The San Antonio, Texas band was formed by Jeff DeCuir and Jess Barnett DeCuir.  Hyperbubble released their debut album Sol!d Pop in 2004.

Albums

Studio albums

A The black vinyl was limited to 100 copies with handmade covers.
B "The CD was released with a coloring book entitled, "Coloring Book Concert".  It featured original art by the band.

Live albums

Soundtracks

Compilation albums

A "The album is identical to Drastic Cinematic but with three additional tracks.

Mix albums

A "The album also had a limited release in 2005 on CD produced by Socket Sounds.

Extended plays

A "EP is referred to by each band respectively as s/t hyperbubble split EP and Hyperbubble + ST and by Discogs after track 1, Minicar.
B "The album has tracks by ShiSho on side A and Hyperbubble on side B.  It was a pink vinyl released as part of Filthy Little Angels' Singles Club package of five split-EPs.  Subsequently, the record cataloged FILTHY 006 was sold as a standalone.  The band later sold it under the title of its featured song, "Supermarket Casanova", which later appears on Airbrushed Alibis.
C "Limited hand-numbered edition of 100 copies, twenty-five of which were sold via Facebook. The remainder were sold at a November 22, 2014 concert with Hyperbubble at The Lexington that was recorded and released as the album, Live in London.
D "Includes tracks from Dee Dee Rocks the Galaxy.

Singles

A The double single was called "Aidan Casserly Vs. Hyperbubble".

Remix singles

Various artist compilation albums
{| class="wikitable plainrowheaders" " border="1"
! scope="col" style="width:23em;"| Title
! scope="col" | Year
! scope="col" style="width:30em;"| Album
|-
! scope="row"| "Starjacker"
|1997
| Acid Ranch 2000
|-
! scope="row"| "Dinner Tempo (Remix)"
|  2002
| ≥ (Greater Than or Equal to)
|-
! scope="row"| "I"
| 2003
| The Schlong Remains the Same
|-
! scope="row"| "Vegetable Man"
| 2004
| The Vegetable Man Project Vol. 3
|-
! scope="row"| "Shopping Cart Factory (Well Thirled Mix)"
| 2005
| ''Rotten Remixes Vol. 2|-
! scope="row"| "Teen Dream  (demo)"
| rowspan="6"| 2006
| A Shoehorn Demo 2
|-
! scope="row"| "Don't Let Me Down (Anti-Gravity Remix)"
| Don't Let Me Down – Remixed
|-
! scope="row"| "You're the One That I Want"
| Down To GREASE On Holiday
|-
! scope="row"| "Stop! (Hyperbubble Remix)"
| Stop!
|-
! scope="row"| "Housewife's Lament"
| Patty Duke Fanzine No. 6: Love To Patty
|-
! scope="row"| "Away in a Manger"
| HARK! The Filthy Angels Sing
|-
! scope="row"| "Pop Goes The World"
| rowspan="6"| 2007
| NineteenEightySeven
|-
! scope="row"| "Sugar, Sugar"
| Wreckollection – Fellowshipwreck Music's 10th Anniversary
|-
! scope="row"| "Christmas Riff"
| Tis The Season To Be Filthy 
|-
! scope="row"| "Another Ride"
| Elektrowelt
|-
! scope="row" rowspan="2" | "Away in a Manger"
| Electric Fantastic Christmas 2007
|-
| The Filth Of Christmas Past
|-
! scope="row"| "Jamie's Cryin'"
| rowspan="7"| 2008
| Nineteen78
|-
! scope="row"| "Another Ride"
| Masters of the Universe Vol. 3
|-
! scope="row"| "Party On Jupiter"
| Just A Minute
|-
! scope="row"| "Sushi Lover (Remix)"
| Sushi Lover
|-
! scope="row"| "Christmas With The Bee Gees (Maurice Mistletoe Mix)"
| Hidden Treasures
|-
! scope="row"| "Christmas With The Bee Gees (Robin Reindeer Mix)"
| Electric Fantastic Christmas 2008
|-
! scope="row"| "Christmas With The Bee Gees (Barry Gentlemen Mix)"
| It'll Be Filthy This Christmas
|-
! scope="row"| "U.F.O. Party Beach"
| rowspan="10"| 2009
| Tribute to John Williams
|-
! scope="row"| "Hyperbubble mix"
| Stolearm – Jesus Missile Remixes
|-
! scope="row"| "I'm in Love with My Clone (Duplicate Mix) 
|Fifth Dimension Volume 2
|-
! scope="row"| "No Anchovies Please"
| Covers & Sleevefaces
|-
! scope="row"| "Non Biodegradable Hazardous Waste Disposal (Valentino Mix)"
| My Filthy Valentine
|-
! scope="row"| *"Femme Fatality Vs Hyperbubble – Come On, Come Out"
| rowspan="2" | One's Not Enough Remixed
|-
! scope="row"| "Femme Fatality Vs Hyperbubble – Lucky Lover"
|-
! scope="row"| "Non Biodegradable Hazardous Waste Disposal"
| Five Years Of Filth: Music vs Money
|-
! scope="row"| "Rudolph The Red Nosed Rocket"
| Electric Fantastic Christmas 2009
|-
! scope="row"| "Away in a Manger"
| Oh Come, All Ye Filthy
|-
! scope="row"| "Candy Apple Daydreams (Extended Remix)"
| rowspan="6"| 2010
| electropop.5
|-
! scope="row" rowspan="2" |"Teenage Timebomb (Hyperbubble's Bonaduce Mix)"
|Decade: 1999-2009 – Celebrating 10 Years of Ninthwave Records
|-
| Synthetic Dance Music Volume 2
|-
! scope="row"| "I Like Birds But I Like Other Animals Too"
| Pick 'n' Mix
|-
! scope="row"| "Jouet Pop"
| Jouet Pop
|-
! scope="row"| "Away in a Manger"
| Electric Fantastic Christmas 2010
|-
! scope="row"| "Starship 909"
| rowspan="10" | 2011
| 1'05 
|-
! scope="row"| "Don't Break My Heart (Hyperbubble Remix)"
| Don't Break My Heart
|-
! scope="row"| "You Save My Life (Hyperbubble Remix)"
| You Save My Life
|-
! scope="row"| "You Lost Me at Hello (Aloha Mix)"
| Tesco Chainstore Mascara
|-
! scope="row"| "Kinky"
| Doppelhertz Vol. 2
|-
! scope="row"| "Western Ware"
| Western
|-
! scope="row"| "Gentil Meussieu (Hyperbubble Remix)"
| Gentil Meussieu
|-
! scope="row"| "Christmas Riff"
| rowspan="3"| Filthy Navidad
|-
! scope="row"| "Away In A Manger"
|-
! scope="row"| "Christmas With The Bee Gees (Barry Gentlemen Mix)"
|-
! scope="row"| "Victoria (Hyperbubble Remix)"
| 2012
| Bad Breaks Remix EP
|-
! scope="row"| "Sky Smasher"
| 2014
| Past Present Future 2
|-
! scope="row"| "Artificial Love (Love Remix by Hyperbubble)"
| 2017
| Royal Visionaries – Remixed Fairytale
|-
! scope="row"| "Bionic Girl"
| 2018
| Man & Machine
|-
! scope="row" rowspan="2" | "(I'm Your) Satellite"
| rowspan="2" | 2020
| THEREMIN100 Limited Vinyl Edition
|-
| THEREMIN100
|-
! scope="row"| "Hologram (Hyperbubble Mix)"
| 2021
| Hologram 2.0
|}

Guest appearances

Music videos

ReferencesGeneral Discography on Hyperbubble's website
 Hyperbubble at AllMusic
 
 Specific'''

External links

Discographies of American artists
Electronic music discographies